Ooklah The Moc is a band from Palolo, Oahu, Hawaii, that  formed in 1997 playing roots reggae. Through the years and several lineup changes, Ooklah became a strictly roots dub reggae band and reached its present 8-person lineup in 2000.

Name origin
The name comes from a cartoon known as Thundarr The Barbarian, which co-starred a large and powerful leonine humanoid creature named Ookla The Mok.

Band members
James "Ras Bird" LaPierre (Vocals)
 Ryan "Jah Gumby" Murakami (Bass)
 John Davis (Drums)
 Asher Philippart (Guitar)
 Micky Huihui (Vocals)
 Kali Navales (Vocals)
 Pokii Seto (Vocals)
 Robert Daguio (Keys)
 Mike Cueva (Tenor Sax)
 Bernard Soriano (Trumpet)

Discography

Influences
 Rastafari
 Aswad
 Roots Radics (Early 1980s)
 Black Slate
 Lincoln Thompson
 Wu-Tang Clan (mid-1990s)
 Steel Pulse
 Coltrane
 Black Uhuru
 Sly & Robbie
 The Abyssinians
 Junior Reid

References

External links
 Ooklah the Moc in Myspace

Musical groups from Hawaii